Cristina García may refer to:
Cristina García (journalist) (born 1958), Cuban-born American journalist and novelist
Cristina Garcia (politician), (born 1977), American politician
Cristina García Rodero (born 1949), Spanish photographer
Cristina García Spínola de Brito (born 1976), Spanish journalist
Cristina García (swimmer), (born 2001), Spanish swimmer